USS Ogden (LPD-5), an , was the second ship of the United States Navy to be named for Ogden, Utah. Ogden was laid down on 4 February 1963 by the New York Naval Shipyard. She was launched on 27 June 1964 sponsored by Mrs. Laurence J. Burton, and commissioned at New York City on 19 June 1965.

Operational history

Vietnam era

After training off Norfolk, Virginia, Ogden arrived at San Diego, California, on 29 October 1965 to join the United States Pacific Fleet and complete her initial training. In her first year of service the ship deployed twice to South Vietnam (8 February through 4 April 1966 and 16 May through 7 July 1966), bringing Marines and their equipment to the Vietnam War. On her return passages, she brought damaged vehicles home for repair. During the summer of 1966, she conducted experiments with aircraft capable of vertical or short landing and take-off. Ogden participated in Operation End Sweep in Haiphong Harbor as a member of Task Force 78 from January 1973 through July 1973, clearing mines with RH-53A helicopters.

In the summer of 1977, Ogden stood off Camp Pendleton Marine Corps Base and acted as the base vessel for the U.S. Army's 2nd Battalion 39th Infantry Regiment of the 1st Brigade of the 9th Infantry Division as it was undergoing amphibious warfare training.  After this was completed Ogden embarked this unit and transported it back to Fort Lewis, Washington.

1989 Oil Spill Task Force 2
Ogden was relieved by  during the Exxon Valdez oil spill after spending two months onsite. She supported over 400 civilians with beds, food, operational command for the task force and helicopter support for Task Force 2.

WestPac

Ogden had turned sailors and Marines into Golden Shellbacks on at least five occasions.  On 10 November 1976, 24 June 1985, 1988, 1992, and again in November 1999, Ogden crossed the Equator and the International Dateline simultaneously.  During the 2001 crossing, Ogden was hosting Alpha Company 1st Blt 4th Marines of the 13th Marine Expeditionary Unit.

Ogden was damaged when she collided with the submarine  on 27 February 2002, which opened a  hole in one of her fuel tanks.

Middle East

She was commissioned as part of the United States 3rd Fleet.  She deployed in early 2006 with the 11th Marine Expeditionary Unit as part of a battle group. They were the first amphibious fleet to be sent to the Persian Gulf during Operation Desert Shield. During this time she was mostly used for intercepting blockade running freighters/tankers.

When Operation Desert Storm started she was part of the task force sent to capture Failaka Island. The island was captured with very little resistance and Ogden transferred the prisoners to Saudi Arabia, making the largest transfer of prisoners on a ship ever.

The ship was originally scheduled for decommissioning in 2000, but with the requirements of the Operation Iraqi Freedom it was rescheduled.

On 16 February 2007, Ogden was awarded the 2006 Battle "E" award.

After a ceremony held aboard the ship in port at Naval Base San Diego, Ogden was decommissioned from the United States Navy on 21 February 2007.

Fate

References

External links 
Video: The ex-USS Ogden (LPD 5) & ex-USS Tuscaloosa (LST 1187) are fired upon by harpoon missiles from the Republic of Korea (ROKS) submarine LeeSunSin (SS 068) and by a Naval Strike Missile (NSM) from the Royal Norwegian Navy frigate HNoMS Fridtjof Nansen (F 310) during a SINKEX as part of Rim of the Pacific (RIMPAC) Exercise 2014.
USS Ogden sunk by Harpoon Missile in naval exercise SINKEX RIMPAC 2014 YouTube

Austin-class amphibious transport docks
Cold War amphibious warfare vessels of the United States
Vietnam War amphibious warfare vessels of the United States
Ships built in Brooklyn
1964 ships
Maritime incidents in 2014
Ships sunk as targets
Shipwrecks in the Pacific Ocean